Sarany Protected Area is a protected area of North Khorasan in northern Iran on the Turkmenistan border. It became protected in 1982. It lies about 40 kilometres south-west of Ashgabat.

References

Protected areas of Iran
Geography of North Khorasan Province
Protected areas established in 1982
1982 establishments in Iran